Red Hot Chilli Pipers are a Celtic rock band from Scotland. Formed in 2002, they became popular internationally in 2007 after winning the BBC talent show When Will I Be Famous?

The band's lineup features three highland bagpipers and traditional marching snare, backed by a five- to seven-piece band. The band's live show also features vocal performances and  highland dancing.

History
Since their formation the Red Hot Chilli Pipers have combined guitars, keyboards, drums and their bagpipes to create 'bagrock' sound. The Red Hot Chilli Pipers perform a fusion of traditional pipe tunes and contemporary pieces. Notable covers performed have included "We Will Rock You" by Queen, "Clocks" by Coldplay and "Smoke on the Water" by Deep Purple as well as "Chasing Cars" by Snow Patrol, "Don't Stop Believing" by Journey.

In 2004, the group appeared on the main stage at T in the Park with the headline band, the rock group The Darkness. They appeared on BBC Radio 1 on the Greg James show in July 2013 and The Radio 1 Breakfast Show with Nick Grimshaw in 2014.

The group appears on the soundtrack of How to Train Your Dragon 2.

Discography
 2005 – The Red Hot Chilli Pipers
 2007 – Bagrock to the Masses
 2008 – Blast Live
 2010 – Music for the Kilted Generation
 2012 – Braveheart
 2013 – Breathe
 2014 – Live at the Lake 2014
 2016 – Octane
 2019 – Fresh Air

The band's first studio release The Red Hot Chilli Pipers (2005), was their least successful. Their 2007 album Bagrock to the Masses went platinum in Scotland and silver in the rest of the UK. Their third album and first live album, Blast Live (2008), went triple platinum in Scotland. Their fourth release Music for the Kilted Generation,  The Red Hot Chilli Pipers' most successful International record to date, reached Number 2 on the US Amazon Chart. behind Adele's record-breaking album, 21. Breathe was released in July 2013 on CD and iTunes.

Tours and performances

The group's highest profile performance's have been on the Main Stage at T in the Park in 2004 where they performed alongside The Darkness, and in 2014 when they performed on the Main Stage again in their own right.

When Will I Be Famous
In 2007, the Red Hot Chilli Pipers appeared on the BBC show When Will I be Famous? hosted by Graham Norton. The band were in the episode and competed against seven others. The eight contestants were paired into a head-to-head showdown in which the winner would be decided by 101 preregistered viewers who were dubbed the "Armchair Judges". The four winners of these head-to-heads would then compete against each other in the second show with the winner being decided by an open public phone vote. In their first head-to-head showdown, The Red Hot Chilli Pipers were pitted against the "Stringfever", a four-member string quartet. The Red Hot Chilli Pipers won the head-to-head 51-50 and went on to win the weekly prize of ten thousand pounds.

After TV appearance
In September 2008, the group performed a Scottish-flavoured medley of songs during the opening of Eurovision Dance Contest 2008 in Glasgow. In 2010, The Red Hot Chilli Pipers completed an 11-date sold-out tour of Scotland, as well as an 11-week tour of Germany and a 7-week tour of America. They also toured Saudi Arabia, Malaysia, India and most of Europe. They performed concerts in New York and Beijing as well as at the Hebridean Celtic Festival in Stornoway.

Musicianship
With a total of four degrees from the Royal Conservatoire of Scotland, many of the band members past & present have competed at the highest level of bagpiping and drumming for many years. Founder and former Musical Director Cassells received BBC Radio Scotland Young Traditional Musician in 2005 and became the first person ever to attain a degree in bagpipes from the Royal Conservatoire of Scotland (Formerly the Royal Scottish Academy of Music and Drama). The snare drummer and percussionist, Grant Cassidy is an 8 time Juvenile Solo World Drumming Champion and in 2016 placed 7th in the adult section of the World Solo Drumming Championships held in Glasgow, Scotland.

Former members
On 23 September 2011, founder and frontman Stuart Cassells, left the band. Prior to leaving, Cassells had been struggling with 'focal hand dystonia', more commonly known as writer's cramp since 2008. Speaking to The Daily Record on the subject, Cassells said, "My left hand refused to stay on the chanter. It was like my left hand wasn't my own, it wouldn't stay still, like someone else was controlling it. I knew in my head how I wanted to play but I couldn't because my hands would curl right up and tense up and move involuntarily. They weren't doing what they were supposed to do. The brain was sending far too many signals to my hands." He tried various treatments throughout this period, including surgery to release a trapped nerve, physiotherapy and botox injections into his arm to relax the muscles. In efforts to help him play the bagpipes, he had McCallum Bagpipes manufacture him a custom chanter that uses flute keys to cover the holes instead of requiring the player to cover them. However, he was still unable to play them and left the band. A recent World Pipe Band Championship winner with the Field Marshal Montgomery Pipe Band, Kyle Warren, replaced him.

Awards and nominations

Scottish Live Act of the Year

|-
| 2007 || Red Hot Chilli Pipers || Scottish Live Act of the Year ||
|-
| 2010 || Red Hot Chilli Pipers || Scottish Live Act of the Year ||

BBC's 'When Will I Be Famous' 
 Winners 2007

References

External links

 

Great Highland bagpipe players
Scottish pipe bands
Musical groups established in 2002
2002 establishments in Scotland
Scottish rock music groups